Broughton is a village and civil parish in the Craven district of North Yorkshire, England.

The 2001 Census recorded a parish population of 81 increasing to 172 at the 2011 Census.

Broughton Hall 

The hall is a Grade I listed building and has been the seat of the Tempest Baronets for 900 years and, although the baronetcy is extinct, it is still run by a direct descendant of the Tempest family. A 14th-century document records the acquisition of a house, watermill and part of the manor of Broughton by Sir John Tempest. The pedimented end wings were added to the main structure for Stephen Tempest, 1809–11, to designs by William Atkinson. Sir Charles Tempest, Bt. (1794–1865) refaced the north front in golden Kendal stone and added a portico, 1838–41, to designs by George Webster, an architect of the dynasty of masons at Kendal (Cumbria). The park was landscaped in the 18th and 19th centuries and the Italianate terraced garden designed by William Andrews Nesfield .

The hall grounds house a business park, with more than 50 companies employing more than 700 people.

In 2019, the Hall was used for filming some scenes for the first series of All Creatures Great and Small. The property was depicted as the home of the fictional Mrs. Pumphrey, owner of Tricki-Woo, a character based on socialite Marjorie Warner who was a client of James Herriot and actually lived at Thorpe House near Thirsk. Other productions have also filmed some scenes at the Hall, including the 2021 BBC One drama Ridley Road.

See also
List of works by George Webster

Notes

External links

Broughton Hall Estate

Villages in North Yorkshire
Civil parishes in North Yorkshire
Craven District
Country houses in North Yorkshire
George Webster buildings